Jack Coleman may refer to:

 Jack Coleman (actor) (born 1958), American actor and screenwriter
 Jack Coleman (basketball) (1924–1998), American basketball player
 Jack Coleman (politician) (born 1953), American politician
 J. C. Coleman (died 1971), Irish geologist and speleologist
 Jack Coleman (soccer) (born 1993), American soccer player

See also
John Coleman (disambiguation)
Coleman (disambiguation)